The Syndicate is a 1968 British film directed by Frederic Goode for Pathé Films, to a screenplay by Geoffrey Hays, from the 1960 novel of the same name by Denys Rhodes. The film stars William Sylvester as an American pilot, June Ritchie and Robert Urquhart as a troubled couple, and Christian Doermer as a German geologist who search for uranium in Kenya.

The film was passed by the British Board of Film Classification on 3 March 1967, with a running time of 106 minutes. It was cut to 63 minutes and released as a supporting feature to Wait Until Dark in September 1968. A 91-minute version was obtained by American International Pictures television division as part of a feature film package, and was retitled Kenya: Country of Treasure.

Plot
An American, down on his luck, joins a German uranium prospector and a Kenyan couple to search for uranium. A series of tragic and mysterious events strike the party.

Cast
William Sylvester - Burt Hickey 
June Ritchie - Mari Brant 
Robert Urquhart - George Brant 
Christian Doermer - Kurt Hohmann 
John Bennett - Dr. Singh

External links

References

1968 films
1968 adventure films
British adventure films
Films set in Kenya
Films shot in Kenya
Treasure hunt films
Films based on British novels
1960s English-language films
1960s British films